Philippe Briones is a French animator, author and comic book artist. His pencils are usually inked by himself.

Biography
He did his studies in France, at the " Beaux-arts" in Beaune, and at the " CFT Goblins" in Paris. Right after his studies, he was recruited  by Disney Studios to work in animation, and he started by working on "A Goofy Movie", in 1994. He worked on several Disney animation movies, but it is important to notice that he has been the clean-up supervisor on Tarzan's adult character, and collaborated with the number one in animation, Glen Keane for 2 years. At the same time, in 2002, he started his author career by working for the French editor "Soleil Production" on  titles such as "Les Seigneurs d'Agartha", "Tales of the Dragon Guard" and "Kookaburra".

He signed his first contract at Marvel Comics in 2006, on the "White Tiger" series. Then, he worked on various series with famous characters such as Namor, Iron Man, Spider-Man, and  X-Men, until he was approached by DC Comics, in 2015. They first offered him to illustrate the "Suicide Squad" series. He then worked on a "Flash" issue, and is now acting on the "Aquaman" Rebirth series.

While drawing for DC Comics, he still works for French editors, with some various and sometimes stunning collaborations (Karate Boy, PSG Heroes). Co-scriptwriter, he also has illustrated the Geek Agency Series, which cleverly associate action, pop culture references and humor. He achieved in 2016 an album in the "7" collection at Delcourt.( "7 héros").

Filmography

Bibliography
French Editors : 
 
Soleil Productions
 (2001-2002) : "Les Seigneurs d'Agartha" issues 1 & 2.  
 (2002-2006) : Tales of the Dragon Guard issues 2 et 4.   
 (2004) : Kookaburra Universe.  
 (2015) : PSG Heroes issues 1 & 2.  
 

"Label Fusion" (Soleil/Panini).
 (2008) : Wanderers : (On an original scenario by Chris Claremont).

Ankama.
 (2012) : Karate boy.
 (2013) : Geek Agency Tome 1 : Resident Geek : Original scenario by Philippe Briones and Romain Huet, drawing and inking by Philippe Briones, colors by Romain Huet. 
 (2013) : Geek Agency Tome 2 : Dragon Geek   : Original scenario by Philippe Briones and Romain Huet, drawing and inking by Philippe Briones, colors by Romain Huet.

Delcourt.
 (2016) : "7 Héros" ( Collection " 7 ", 3rd Season ).
American Editors :

Marvel Comics.
 (2006) : White Tiger #1-5 : Drawing, inked by Don Hillsman.
 (2007) : Namor #1-6 : #1-3 Drawing and inking, #4-6 Drawing, inked by Scott Hanna. 
 (2008-2009) : X-Men Legacy #216,219 et 225 : #216 Drawing, inked by Scott Hanna #219 inked by Cam Smith, #225 drawing and inking. 
 (2009) : Mrs Marvel  #245. 
 (2009) : Iron Man vs Whiplash #1-4.  
 (2010) : American Son #1-4.  
 (2010) : Iron Man Legacy #10-11 : Drawing, inked by Jeff Huet.  
 (2010) : Web of Spider man #7 & 12  
 (2011) : Captain America Corps #1-5 : In collaboration with Roger Stern.
 (2013-2014) : Uncanny X- Force #13-15
(2015) : X-Men #13-15,17.
DC Comics.
 (2015-2016) : Suicide Squad #8-16.
 (2015) : Suicide Squad Annual #1.
 (2016) : Flash #49. 
(2016) : Aquaman (Rebirth) #3-5.

References

 http://marvel.com/comics/creators/1122/philippe_briones
 http://www.dccomics.com/talent/philippe-briones His page on DC Comics.com
 http://www.bedetheque.com/auteur-5724-BD-Briones-Philippe.html
 http://culturebox.francetvinfo.fr/livres/bande-dessinee/rencontre-avec-philippe-briones-le-frenchie-qui-dessine-spider-man-155089

External links
 His page on Marvel.com
 His page on DC Comics.com
 His Page on BDGEST
 His Blog
 Comiccon Interview
 Phil Briones on Comicvine

Living people
French animators
French comics artists
French male writers
Year of birth missing (living people)